Asher Welch (born 16 April 1944) is a Jamaican former professional soccer player who played in the NASL between 1967 and 1970 for the Baltimore Bays and Kansas City Spurs. He began his career in Jamaica with Cavaliers FC, alongside twin brother Art.

External links
 NASL career stats

1944 births
Living people
Sportspeople from Kingston, Jamaica
Jamaican footballers
Jamaican expatriate footballers
Jamaica international footballers
Kansas City Spurs players
North American Soccer League (1968–1984) players
National Professional Soccer League (1967) players
Baltimore Bays players
Expatriate soccer players in the United States
Jamaican twins
Twin sportspeople
Jamaican expatriate sportspeople in the United States
Association football forwards
Cavalier F.C. players